Las Pulgas is Spanish for The Fleas and may refer to:

Camp Las Pulgas
Las Pulgas Creek
Las Pulgas Lake
Las Pulgas Valley
Rancho de las Pulgas
Pulgas Water Temple